In Greek mythology, Eurythoe is one of the Danaïdes. She is one of the possible mothers of Oenomaus by Ares; she is alternatively the mother of Hippodamia by Oenomaus.

References

Danaids
Women in Greek mythology
Characters in Greek mythology